(JSAP) is a Japanese group of researchers in the field of applied physics. JSAP originated in 1932 from a voluntary forum of researchers belonging to the University of Tokyo and the Institute of Physical and Chemical Research. During World War II, most research, even applied, was frozen. In 1946, the society was established as an official academic society.

Oyo Buturi
Oyo Buturi is the membership subscription of the Japan Society of Applied Physics. It is published monthly, in Japanese. Oyo Buturi International (1998) and JSAP International (2000-2008) are related English counterparts to Oyo Buturi.

Publications of the Japan Society of Applied Physics
 Japanese Journal of Applied Physics
 Applied Physics Express
 Optical Review
 Oyo Buturi
 Oyo Buturi International
 JSAP International

See also
 The Physical Society of Japan
 Optical Society of Japan

References

External links
JSAP homepage 
JSAP homepage 

Scientific societies based in Japan
Physics organizations
1949 establishments in Japan
Scientific organizations established in 1949
Public Interest Incorporated Associations (Japan)